FC Sioni is a Georgian football club based in Bolnisi. Following the 2022 season, they were relegated to Erovnuli Liga Liga 2, the second tier of the Georgian league system.

The team has won the league title on one occasion, in 2005/06. Sioni play their home matches at local stadium named after Tamaz Stepania.

History
The football club in Bolnisi was founded in 1936. For years they took part in Georgian domestic competitions under the name Madneuli. While being in the second division in early 1990s, the team emerged among the candidates challenging for the top league.

For the first time Sioni participated in Umaglesi Liga in the 1995/96 season and after initial several years made significant progress towards joining ambitious clubs vying for titles.

In 2002, they reached the Cup final, although failed to prevail over Dinamo Tbilisi.

In the 2003/04 season, Sioni and FC WIT Georgia shared the first position in the league, and the title was decided in a championship play-off. WIT won the game 2–0, but the crowd violence during the match led UEFA to ban Sioni from the UEFA Cup participation.

The third attempt two years later turned out successful. The club set a remarkable unbeaten home record by winning 14 games out of 15 and ended the season five points clear of a main rival. Kakha Tskhadadze became Manager of the Year, while striker Koka Mikuchadze, who scored 19 goals, was named in the symbolic team of the season. Sioni represented Georgia in the UEFA Champions League 2006-07, where they defeated FK Baku from Azerbaijan in the first qualifying round,  but were eliminated by Bulgarian champions Levski Sofia in the second stage, losing 2–0 both home and away.

As champions, in January 2007 Sioni participated in the CIS Cup in Moscow where they defeated two opponents out of three, although failed to qualify for the play-offs on goal difference.

Sioni achieved another league success in 2013/14. Under Vladimir Burduli the club, strengthened by some experienced players, including former national team members Valeri Abramidze and Revaz Kemoklidze, won the bronze medals. Two years later Sioni played in the national Cup final for the second time in fifteen years. Soon their performance deteriorated, which saw the team relegated to Liga 2 for the first time in the last two decades.

Following a two-year tenure in the second division, Sioni secured another promotion in 2021. The team topped the league from the very beginning and, although slipped up in midseason which resulted in the sacking of the manager, eventually they comfortably won the championship contest.

Sioni spent the entire 2022 season in battles to move out of the drop zone. Due to poor results, the club twice replaced managers during the year. At the end of the season, they lost both play-off ties to Samtredia and suffered a third relegation in seven seasons.

Seasons

Domestic leagues

Notes

Overall 

Seasons spent in Georgian leagues since 1990:

● Umaglesi Liga / Erovnuli Liga (1st tier): 25

● Pirveli Liga / Erovnuli Liga 2 (2nd tier): 8

● Meore Liga (3rd tier): 1

Correct up to 2022 season

European football

Current squad 
As of 28 February 2023

Managers

 Kakha Tskhadadze (Dec 31, 2005 – Aug 31, 2006)
 Giorgi Kipshidze (Jul 1, 2007 – Jun 30, 2008)
 Otar Korgalidze (Jul 1, 2008 – Jun 30, 2009)
 Temur Makharadze (Jul 1, 2008 – Jun 30, 2010)
 Giorgi Kipshidze (Jul 1, 2010 – Mar 19, 2011)
 Khvicha Kasrashvili (Mar 18, 2011–1?)
 Vakhtang Chagelishvili (Jul 1, 2011–1?)
 Levan Bajelidze (Sept 15, 2011 – Jan 12, 2012)
 Khvicha Kasrashvili (Jan 15 – Aug 27, 2012)
 Armaz Jeladze (Aug 28, 2012 – Jun 1, 2013)
 Giorgi Kiknadze (Jun 1, 2013–Oct, 2013)
 Vladimir Burduli (Oct, 2013–)
 Koba Zhorzhikashvili (2017-2018)
 Teimuraz Shalamberidze (2018-2019)
 Davit Kokiashvili (Feb - Jul 2020)
 Varlam Kilasonia (Jul 2020 - June 2021)
 Giorgi Daraselia (June 2021 - March 2022)
 Ucha Sosiashvili (March - November 2022)
 Giorgi Chelidze (November - December 2022)
 Koba Zhorzhikashvili (Since February 2023)

Honours
Umaglesi Liga/Erovnuli Liga
 Winners (1): 2005–06
 Runners-up (1): 2003-04
Third place (1): 2013-14
Pirveli Liga/Erovnuli Liga 2
 Winners (2): 1994–95  East , 2021
 Third place (1): 2017 
Georgian Cup
Runners-up (2): 2002-03, 2015-16

Sponsors
Rich Metals Group, engaged in mining activities near Bolnisi, signed a first sponsorship contract with Sioni in 2016.

Name 
While Sioni is a Georgian equivalent of Zion, the football club is named after Bolnisi Sioni, the fifth century cathedral located near the current municipal centre.

References

External links 
 Official website
 Official Facebook page
 Profile on Soccerway

 
Sioni Bolnisi
Association football clubs established in 1936
1936 establishments in Georgia (country)
FC Sioni Bolnisi